Jerry W. Holbert (November 9, 1958 – August 2, 2022) was an American cartoonist best known for his political cartoons. Holbert had a syndicated editorial comic strip. He received the National Cartoonist Society Editorial Cartoon Award for the year 2000.

Holbert was born in Long Branch, New Jersey on November 9, 1958, and grew up in Middletown Township, New Jersey.

Holbert worked for the Boston Herald newspaper, where he published editorial cartoons. In October 2014, Holbert came under criticism for what many people viewed as a racist depiction of United States President Barack Obama which used the watermelon stereotype: Holbert pictured a White House intruder using the president's bathtub while recommending to Obama the use of watermelon-flavored toothpaste. After negative public reaction, Holbert and the Boston Herald apologized, and the nationally syndicated version of the cartoon changed the toothpaste flavor.

Holbert died in Derry, New Hampshire on August 2, 2022, at the age of 63.

References

External links
NCS Awards
Boston Herald Jerry Holbert Cartoon Page dead link
gocomics.com Jerry Holbert Cartoon Page 
Holbert's Obama/watermelon cartoon (reprinted in ArtNet criticism)

1958 births
2022 deaths
American editorial cartoonists
People from Middletown Township, New Jersey